Danny O'Hanlon (born 1987) is an Irish hurler who plays at club level with Carrick Swans. He is a former member of the Tipperary senior hurling team.

Playing career

O'Hanlon first played hurling at juvenile and underage levels with the Carrick Swans club, before joining the club's top adult team. He first appeared on the inter-county scene at minor level with Tipperary before later lining out in the 2006 All-Ireland under-21 final defeat by Kilkenny. He was drafted onto the Tipperary senior hurling team in 2007. O'Hanlon won an All-Ireland Championship title with the Tipperary intermediate team in 2013.

Career statistics

Honours

Carrick Swans
Munster Intermediate Hurling Championship: 2010, 2017

Tipperary
All-Ireland Intermediate Hurling Championship: 2013
Munster Intermediate Hurling Championship: 2013
Munster Under-21 Hurling Championship: 2006, 2008

References

1987 births
Living people
Carrick Swans hurlers
Tipperary inter-county hurlers